The 2021 FIBA U18 European Challengers were international basketball competitions which took place from 3 to 8 August 2021, replacing the cancelled 2021 FIBA U18 European Championship.

History
The 2020 edition of FIBA U18 European Championship was to be held in Konya, Turkey but was postponed to 2021 due to COVID-19 pandemic. 
Since the pandemic continued in 2021, the FIBA Europe decided to hold alternative format of competition to replace traditional format of U18 European Championship where 16 or more teams gather in one place.

Structure
 The events are to be played on a voluntary participation basis, with promotion/relegation to be frozen across Divisions A, B and C.
 The Top 18 ranked teams (16 currently in Division A, plus two additional teams by 2019 ranking in respective category) to play three tournaments of six teams each (Groups A, B and C).
 All other registered teams, ranked 19 and lower, to play in tournaments of up to six teams each (Groups D/E).
 One tournament of up to six teams to be created with the lowest-ranked teams to accommodate Division C and Small Countries (Groups F/G).
 All tournaments to be played in Round Robin format, with groups to be created by "serpentine" style allocation, taking the hosting situation into consideration.

Participating teams

Top-18 Challengers
 
 
 
 
 
 
 
 
 
 
 
 
 
 
 
 
 
 

19–25 Challenger
 
 
 
 
 
 
 

26–32 Challenger

Top-18 Challengers

Group A
The Group A tournament was played in Skopje, North Macedonia.

Group B
The Group B tournament was played in Tel Aviv, Israel.

Group C
The Group C tournament was played in Konya, Turkey.

19–25 Challenger
The Groups D/E tournament was played in Levice, Slovakia.

Group phase

Group D

Group E

Consolation round

Group Z

Final Four

19th–22nd place semifinals

21st place match

19th place match

Final standings

26–32 Challenger
The Groups F/G tournament was played in Tirana, Albania.

Group phase

Group F

Group G

Consolation round

Group X

Final Four

26th–29th place semifinals

28th place match

26th place match

Final standings

See also
 2021 FIBA U20 European Challengers
 2021 FIBA U16 European Challengers
 2021 FIBA U20 Women's European Challengers
 2021 FIBA U18 Women's European Challengers
 2021 FIBA U16 Women's European Challengers

References

External links
Official website
Competition schedule

FIBA Europe Under-18 Challengers
FIBA U18 European Championship
Basketball competitions in Europe between national teams
Europe
Sports competitions in Skopje
Sports competitions in Tel Aviv
Sport in Konya
Sports competitions in Tirana
August 2021 sports events in Europe
2021 in youth sport